NGC 3370 (also known as UGC 5887 or Silverado Galaxy)  is a spiral galaxy about 98 million light-years away in the constellation Leo. It is comparable to our Milky Way both in diameter (100,000 light years) and mass (1011 solar masses).  NGC 3370 exhibits an intricate spiral arm structure surrounding a poorly defined nucleus. It is a member of the NGC 3370 Group of galaxies, which is a member of the Leo II Groups, a series of galaxies and galaxy clusters strung out from the right edge of the Virgo Supercluster.

History
NGC 3370 was likely discovered by William Herschel, who provided it with the designation II 81. His son John later designated it 750. William Herschel cataloged I 80 to NGC 3348 before and II 82 to NGC 3455 after NGC 3370.

The object has a surface brightness of 13 and a position angle (PA) of 140°.

On November 14, 1994, S. Van Dyk and the Leuschner Observatory Supernova Search discovered a supernova in NGC 3370 at 10h 44m 21.52s +17° 32′ 20.7′′, designated SN 1994ae. SN 1994ae was a type Ia supernova, and one of the nearest and best observed since the advent of modern digital detectors. The maximal light of the supernova was estimated to have occurred between November 30 and December 1, peaking at visual magnitude 13.

See also 
 New General Catalogue (NGC)
 NGC 1365, spiral galaxy

References

External links 

 HST: Celestial Composition
 Ho et al., BVRI Photometry of Supernovae
NGC 3370 at ESA/Hubble

Unbarred spiral galaxies
Leo (constellation)
3370
05887
32207
17840321